Ruth Williams (born 31 August 1989) is a Jamaican female badminton player. In 2014, he competed at the Commonwealth Games in Glasgow, Scotland. In 2015, he competed at the Pan Am Games in Toronto, Canada. In 2016, she won the Jamaica International tournament in the women's doubles event partnered with Katherine Wynter.

Achievements

BWF International Challenge/Series
Women's Doubles

 BWF International Challenge tournament
 BWF International Series tournament
 BWF Future Series tournament

References

External links
 

1989 births
Living people
People from Mandeville, Jamaica
Jamaican female badminton players
Commonwealth Games competitors for Jamaica
Badminton players at the 2014 Commonwealth Games
Pan American Games competitors for Jamaica
Badminton players at the 2015 Pan American Games